With a Twist is the third studio album by American men's singing group, Straight No Chaser. It was released in the US on April 13, 2010 and on February 28, 2011 in the UK. It has peaked to number 29 on the U.S. Billboard 200.

Track listing

Chart performance

Release history

References

2010 albums
Pop rock albums by American artists
Atco Records albums
Atlantic Records albums
Straight No Chaser (group) albums